

B
Ferris Beekley

C
Ken Crawford

D
Dane Dastillung,
Fred Day,
Mel Doherty

E
Guy Early

H
Earl Hauser

K
Shiner Knab

L
Trader Lane,
Art Lewis,
Carl Lynch

M
Frank McCormick,
Tommy McMahon,
Tom Melvin,
George Munns

O
Ohmer, Henry Orth

R
George Roudebush

S
Walt Schupp

T
Dave Thompson

V
Pete Volz

References
Pro Football Reference Cincinnati Celts Roster

List
Cincinnati C
Celts